Chagherbit-e Bala (also Romanized as Chagherbīt-e Bālā; also known as Jowgharbīt and Joghrbīt) is a village in Bahu Kalat Rural District, Dashtiari District, Chabahar County, Sistan and Baluchestan Province, Iran. At the 2006 census, its population was 47, in 10 families.

References 

Populated places in Chabahar County